Ethan Panizza is an Australian television actor and former football player from Albany, Western Australia. Panizza was interested in acting from an early age but chose to pursue a career in Australian rules football. He is the son of successful footballer Darrell Panizza and played in the West Australian Football League. He played his last professional game in 2014 and decided to concentrate on his acting career. He began by appearing in short film and television commercials. In 2018, Panizza took the role of Rusty O'Reilly in the Network Ten drama series Playing for Keeps.

Early life and AFL career
Ethan Panizza was born in Albany, Western Australia and is the son of the Australian rules footballer Darrell Panizza. He attended Albany Senior High School and took part in amateur drama productions. When his parents split-up, he moved to the Gold Coast with his mother Diane. He had a passion for acting as a child and felt that it gave him an outlet to express himself. Despite advice from his mother to pursue acting, Panizza decided to begin a football career in an attempt to reconnect with his father back in Western Australia. Panizza began playing for the Claremont Football Club. He later sustained a hamstring injury leaving him unable to play for eight weeks. While he recovered, Panizza used the time to take an acting course. Actor John Orcsik singled out Panizza performance on the course and resulted in him changing his career aspirations.

In 2014, he signed up to a twenty-week course at The Australian Film & Television Academy (TAFTA) in Sydney. Panizza had to decline to participate in the finals for Claremont Tigers in the WA Football League and take on the TAFTA course. Panizza believed that football taught him the skills to work hard to become successful. While studying in Sydney he took a full-time job as an electrician. Panizza soon signed with the American management company Silver Lining Entertainment. He was also selected for further acting training in Los Angeles.

Acting career
He resumed his acting career by appearing in a number of television commercials and music videos. In 2013, he appeared in two short films titled Turkish Delight and Blue Boys. In 2014, the actor appeared in the Australian television documentary series The War That Changed Us, playing Harold Burk. Panizza played the guest role of Ray Davis in an episode of the ABC drama The Doctor Blake Mysteries.

In May 2018, it was announced that he had secured the role of Rusty O'Reilly in the Network Ten drama series Playing for Keeps. The show is about a group of AFL players and their wives' personal lives. Panizza's background in football benefited him during filming as he was able to accurately portray an AFL player. Rusty is a gay character who is forced to come out in the Australian media. To prepare for the role Panizza researched coming out stories on the internet. The actor hoped the story would inspire football players to be more open about their sexual orientation.

Filmography

References

External links
 
 Ethan Panizza at the West Australian Football League

Living people
21st-century Australian male actors
Australian male television actors
Australian rules footballers from Western Australia
Claremont Football Club players
People from Albany, Western Australia
Year of birth missing (living people)